The 2001 Arizona Diamondbacks, in their fourth year of existence, looked to improve on their 2000 season. They had to contend in what was a strong National League West Division.

Arizona had the best one-two pitching combination in the majors: Curt Schilling and Randy Johnson, who combined for 43 victories. Outfielder Luis Gonzalez slugged 57 home runs. They finished the regular season with a record of 92-70, which was good enough for the division title.

In the playoffs, they won their NLDS matchup vs. St. Louis on a walk-off hit by Tony Womack. They defeated the Braves in five games in the NLCS. In the World Series, they won a dramatic seven-game series against the New York Yankees on a walk-off hit by Gonzalez, against Yankees closer Mariano Rivera. The Arizona Diamondbacks became the fastest expansion franchise in Major League history to win a World Series title in just their fourth season. The championship remains the only one won by an Arizona based sports team.

Offseason
November 2, 2000: Ken Huckaby was signed as a free agent with the Arizona Diamondbacks.
December 8, 2000: Mark Grace signed as a free agent with the Arizona Diamondbacks.
December 15, 2000: Midre Cummings was signed as a free agent with the Arizona Diamondbacks.
March 8, 2001: Mike Mohler was signed as a free agent with the Arizona Diamondbacks.

Spring training
The 2001 Arizona Diamondbacks held their 4th spring training at Tucson Electric Park in Tucson, Arizona.

Regular season
Randy Johnson recorded 20 strikeouts in nine innings against the Cincinnati Reds on May 8, 2001. Johnson shares the record with Roger Clemens, Kerry Wood, and most recently Max Scherzer.
On July 19, 2001, Johnson set another record when the previous night's game against the San Diego Padres was delayed by two electrical explosions that knocked out a light tower in Qualcomm Stadium. When the game resumed the following day, Johnson replaced original starter Curt Schilling in the top of the third inning. He pitched the next seven innings, and struck out 16 Padres. Johnson set a new record for strikeouts in a relief appearance, a record that was set 88 years previously by Walter Johnson, who struck out 15 batters in 11 innings on July 25, 1913.
Johnson went on to win 20 games for the second time in his career while striking out over 300 hitters for the fourth consecutive year. On October 2, 2001, Randy Johnson earned his 200th career win.

Opening Day starters
Jay Bell
David Dellucci
Steve Finley
Luis Gonzalez
Mark Grace
Damian Miller
Randy Johnson
Matt Williams
Tony Womack

Season standings

Record vs. opponents

Notable transactions
June 5, 2001: Dan Uggla was drafted by the Arizona Diamondbacks in the 11th round of the 2001 amateur draft. Player signed June 6, 2001.
June 5, 2001: Ian Kinsler was drafted by the Arizona Diamondbacks in the 26th round of the 2001 amateur draft, but did not sign.

Roster

Game log

|- bgcolor=#bfb
| 1 || April 3 || @ Dodgers || 3–2 || Johnson (1–0) || Nunez (0–1) || Mantei (1) || Dodger Stadium || 22,927 || 1–0 || W1
|- bgcolor=#bfb
| 2 || April 4 || @ Dodgers || 7–2 || Schilling (1–0) || Dreifort (0–1) || — || Dodger Stadium || 34,301 || 2–0 || W2
|- bgcolor=#fbb
| 3 || April 5 || @ Dodgers || 5–7 || Ashby (1–0) || Anderson (0–1) || Shaw (2) || Dodger Stadium || 20,542 || 2–1 || L1
|- bgcolor=#fbb
| 4 || April 6 || Cardinals || 9–12 || Hermanson (1–0) || Reynoso (0–1) || — || Bank One Ballpark || 46,079 || 2–2 || L2
|- bgcolor=#fbb
| 5 || April 7 || Cardinals || 4–8 || Kile (1–1) || Witt (0–1) || — || Bank One Ballpark || 34,404 || 2–3 || L3
|- bgcolor=#fbb
| 6 || April 8 || Cardinals || 4–9 || Ankiel (1–0) || Johnson (1–1) || Timlin (1) || Bank One Ballpark || 36,714 || 2–4 || L4
|- bgcolor=#bfb
| 7 || April 10 || Dodgers || 2–0 || Schilling (2–0) || Brown (0–1) || — || Bank One Ballpark || 29,191 || 3–4 || W1
|- bgcolor=#fbb
| 8 || April 11 || Dodgers || 5–11 || Dreifort (1–1) || Anderson (0–2) || — || Bank One Ballpark || 25,974 || 3–5 || L1
|- bgcolor=#fbb
| 9 || April 12 || Dodgers || 4–5 || Ashby (2–0) || Reynoso (0–2) || Shaw (3) || Bank One Ballpark || 29,465 || 3–6 || L2
|- bgcolor=#bfb
| 10 || April 13 || @ Rockies || 7–3 || Johnson (2–1) || Bohanon (0–2) || — || Coors Field || 38,564 || 4–6 || W1
|- bgcolor=#fbb
| 11 || April 14 || @ Rockies || 8–9 || Myers (1–1) || Kim (0–1) || Jimenez (3) || Coors Field || 42,319 || 4–7 || L1
|- bgcolor=#fbb
| 12 || April 15 || @ Rockies || 7–10  || Estrada (1–1) || Brohawn (0–1) || — || Coors Field || 36,841 || 4–8 || L2
|- bgcolor=#bfb
| 13 || April 16 || @ Cardinals || 2–1 || Ellis (1–0) || Morris (1–2) || Mantei (2) || Busch Memorial Stadium || 25,625 || 5–8 || W1 
|- bgcolor=#bfb
| 14 || April 17 || @ Cardinals || 17–4 || Reynoso (1–2) || Hermanson (1–1) || — || Busch Memorial Stadium || 28,517 || 6–8 || W2 
|- bgcolor=#fbb
| 15 || April 18 || @ Cardinals || 1–3 || Kile (2–2) || Johnson (2–2) || Kline (2) || Busch Memorial Stadium || 29,144 || 6–9 || L1
|- bgcolor=#bfb
| 16 || April 20 || Rockies || 3–2 || Kim (1–1) || White (0–2) || — || Bank One Ballpark || 32,011 || 7–9 || W1
|- bgcolor=#bfb
| 17 || April 21 || Rockies || 10–5 || Ellis (2–0) || Villone (0–1) || — || Bank One Ballpark || 31,724 || 8–9 || W2
|- bgcolor=#fbb
| 18 || April 22 || Rockies || 1–2 || Astacio (3–1) || Reynoso (1–3) || Jimenez (5) || Bank One Ballpark || 31,076 || 8–10 || L1
|- bgcolor=#bfb
| 19 || April 23 || Marlins || 9–0 || Johnson (3–2) || Dempster (2–2) || — || Bank One Ballpark || 23,328 || 9–10 || W1
|- bgcolor=#bfb
| 20 || April 24 || Marlins || 9–8 || Prinz (1–0) || Almanza (0–1) || Springer (1) || Bank One Ballpark || 24,135 || 10–10 || W2
|- bgcolor=#bfb
| 21 || April 25 || Marlins || 10–7 || Schilling (3–0) || Grilli (2–2) || Prinz (1) || Bank One Ballpark || 23,097 || 11–10 || W3
|- bgcolor=#bfb
| 22 || April 26 || Braves || 13–6 || Ellis (3–0) || Maddux (2–2) || — || Bank One Ballpark || 27,362 || 12–10 || W4
|- bgcolor=#fbb
| 23 || April 27 || Braves || 0–9 || Burkett (1–3) || Reynoso (1–4) || — || Bank One Ballpark || 32,663 || 12–11 || L1
|- bgcolor=#fbb
| 24 || April 28 || Braves || 1–3 || Glavine (4–1) || Johnson (3–3) || Rocker (6) || Bank One Ballpark || 45,264 || 12–12 || L2
|- bgcolor=#bfb
| 25 || April 29 || Braves || 7–5 || Sabel (1–0) || Perez (1–4) || Brohawn (1) || Bank One Ballpark || 34,356 || 13–12 || W1
|-

|- bgcolor=#bfb
| 26 || May 1 || @ Expos || 8–3 || Schilling (4–0) || Reames (2–2) || — || Olympic Stadium || 4,340 || 14–12 || W2
|- bgcolor=#fbb
| 27 || May 2 || @ Expos || 3–4 || Armas (1–4) || Anderson (0–3) || Lloyd (1) || Olympic Stadium || 4,352 || 14–13 || L1
|- bgcolor=#bfb
| 28 || May 3 || @ Expos || 2–1 || Kim (2–1) || Lloyd (2–1) || Prinz (2) || Olympic Stadium || 4,788 || 15–13 || W1
|- bgcolor=#fbb
| 29 || May 4 || @ Mets || 2–4 || Reed (4–1) || Batista (0–1) || Franco (1) || Shea Stadium || 36,945 || 15–14 || L1
|- bgcolor=#fbb
| 30 || May 5 || @ Mets || 1–8 || Rusch (2–1) || Ellis (3–1) || — || Shea Stadium || 35,630 || 15–15 || L2
|- bgcolor=#bfb
| 31 || May 6 || @ Mets || 8–2 || Schilling (5–0) || Trachsel (1–5) || — || Shea Stadium || 37,673 || 16–15 || W1
|- bgcolor=#fbb
| 32 || May 7 || Reds || 4–5  || Graves (1–0) || Swindell (0–1) || — || Bank One Ballpark || 25,636 || 16–16 || L1
|- bgcolor=#bfb
| 33 || May 8 || Reds || 4–3  || Brohawn (1–1) || Graves (1–1) || — || Bank One Ballpark || 29,817 || 17–16 || W1
|- bgcolor=#bfb
| 34 || May 9 || Reds || 5–2 || Batista (1–1) || Mercado (1–2) || Prinz (3) || Bank One Ballpark || 26,150 || 18–16 || W2
|- bgcolor=#fbb
| 35 || May 11 || Phillies || 1–5 || Wolf (3–4) || Schilling (5–1) || — || Bank One Ballpark || 30,291 || 18–17 || L1
|- bgcolor=#fbb
| 36 || May 12 || Phillies || 5–6  || Bottalico (2–2) || Batista (1–2) || Mesa (10) || Bank One Ballpark || 33,515 || 18–18 || L2
|- bgcolor=#bfb
| 37 || May 13 || Phillies || 6–1 || Johnson (4–3) || Person (3–4) || — || Bank One Ballpark || 32,223 || 19–18 || W1
|- bgcolor=#bfb
| 38 || May 15 || @ Reds || 5–1 || Sabel (2–0) || Wohlers (1–1) || Kim (1) || Cinergy Field || 19,201 || 20–18 || W2
|- bgcolor=#bfb
| 39 || May 16 || @ Reds || 2–1 || Schilling (6–1) || Reith (0–1) || Kim (2) || Cinergy Field || 21,843 || 21–18 || W3
|- bgcolor=#bfb
| 40 || May 17 || @ Reds || 7–2 || Anderson (1–3) || Brower (2–2) || — || Cinergy Field || 23,723 || 22–18 || W4
|- bgcolor=#bfb
| 41 || May 18 || @ Cubs || 4–0 || Johnson (5–3) || Lieber (3–3) || — || Wrigley Field || 37,830 || 23–18 || W5
|- bgcolor=#fbb
| 42 || May 19 || @ Cubs || 2–6 || Wood (2–4) || Batista (1–3) || — || Wrigley Field || 40,153 || 23–19 || L1
|- bgcolor=#fbb
| 43 || May 20 || @ Cubs || 5–6 || Tapani (6–1) || Ellis (3–2) || Fassero (10) || Wrigley Field || 39,350 || 23–20 || L2
|- bgcolor=#bfb
| 44 || May 21 || Giants || 4–2 || Schilling (7–1) || Rueter (4–5) || — || Bank One Ballpark || 28,628 || 24–20 || W1
|- bgcolor=#bfb
| 45 || May 22 || Giants || 12–8 || Anderson (2–3) || Ortiz (6–3) || — || Bank One Ballpark || 33,323 || 25–20 || W2
|- bgcolor=#fbb
| 46 || May 23 || Giants || 1–5 || Gardner (1–3) || Johnson (5–4) || — || Bank One Ballpark || 34,922 || 25–21 || L1
|- bgcolor=#fbb
| 47 || May 24 || @ Padres || 1–3 || Serrano (2–1) || Brohawn (1–2) || Hoffman (10) || Qualcomm Stadium || 19,450 || 25–22 || L2
|- bgcolor=#bfb
| 48 || May 25 || @ Padres || 7–1 || Sabel (3–0) || Jones (2–6) || — || Qualcomm Stadium || 29,965 || 26–22 || W1
|- bgcolor=#bfb
| 49 || May 26 || @ Padres || 3–1 || Schilling (8–1) || Eaton (6–3) || — || Qualcomm Stadium || 49,300 || 27–22 || W2
|- bgcolor=#bfb
| 50 || May 27 || @ Padres || 6–4 || Swindell (1–1) || Hoffman (2–2) || Prinz (4) || Qualcomm Stadium || 34,053 || 28–22 || W3
|- bgcolor=#bfb
| 51 || May 28 || @ Giants || 2–1  || Batista (2–3) || Worrell (1–1)  || — || Pacific Bell Park || 41,341 || 29–22 || W4
|- bgcolor=#bfb
| 52 || May 29 || @ Giants || 1–0  || Batista (3–3) || Vogelsong (0–1) || Swindell (1) || Pacific Bell Park || 39,709 || 30–22 || W5
|- bgcolor=#bfb
| 53 || May 30 || @ Giants || 4–3 || Ellis (4–2) || Hernandez (3–8) || Prinz (5) || Pacific Bell Park || 40,313 || 31–22 || W6
|-

|- bgcolor=#bfb
| 54 || June 1 || Padres || 4–2 || Schilling (9–1) || Williams (5–4) || Kim (3) || Bank One Ballpark || 32,234 || 32–22 || W7
|- bgcolor=#bfb
| 55 || June 2 || Padres || 2–1 || Prinz (2–0) || Davey (0–1) || — || Bank One Ballpark || 34,325 || 33–22 || W8
|- bgcolor=#bfb
| 56 || June 3 || Padres || 8–4 || Johnson (6–4) || Jarvis (3–5) || — || Bank One Ballpark || 37,500 || 34–22 || W9
|- bgcolor=#fbb
| 57 || June 4 || Dodgers || 4–8 || Park (7–4) || Reynoso (1–5) || — || Bank One Ballpark || 26,485 || 34–23 || L1
|- bgcolor=#fbb
| 58 || June 5 || Dodgers || 5–6 || Herges (3–4) || Kim (2–2) || Shaw (18) || Bank One Ballpark || 32,699 || 34–24 || L2
|- bgcolor=#bfb
| 59 || June 6 || Dodgers || 4–1 || Schilling (10–1) || Prokopec (6–2) || — || Bank One Ballpark || 31,046 || 35–24 || W1
|- bgcolor=#bfb
| 60 || June 7 || Dodgers || 13–9 || Batista (4–3) || Dreifort (3–5) || — || Bank One Ballpark || 32,658 || 36–24 || W2
|- bgcolor=#bfb
| 61 || June 8 || @ Royals || 11–4 || Johnson (7–4) || Byrd (0–2) || — || Kauffman Stadium || 20,349 || 37–24 || W3
|- bgcolor=#fbb
| 62 || June 9 || @ Royals || 2–3 || Stein (3–4) || Reynoso (1–6) || Hernandez (9) || Kauffman Stadium || 26,879 || 37–25 || L1
|- bgcolor=#bfb
| 63 || June 10 || @ Royals || 12–5 || Ellis (5–2) || Reichert (5–6) || — || Kauffman Stadium || 16,573 || 38–25 || W1
|- bgcolor=#fbb
| 64 || June 12 || Cubs || 2–6 || Wood (6–4) || Schilling (10–2) || — || Bank One Ballpark || 40,191 || 38–26 || L1
|- bgcolor=#bfb
| 65 || June 13 || Cubs || 13–3 || Bierbrodt (1–0) || Tapani (8–2) || — || Bank One Ballpark || 33,670 || 39–26 || W1
|- bgcolor=#bfb
| 66 || June 14 || Cubs || 3–2 || Johnson (8–4) || Bere (4–3) || Swindell (2) || Bank One Ballpark || 40,093 || 40–26 || W2
|- bgcolor=#fbb
| 67 || June 15 || Tigers || 2–5 || Holt (5–5) || Brohawn (1–3) || Anderson (5) || Bank One Ballpark || 31,683 || 40–27 || L1
|- bgcolor=#bfb
| 68 || June 16 || Tigers || 3–1 || Ellis (6–2) || Blair (0–1) || Prinz (6) || Bank One Ballpark || 35,028 || 41–27 || W1
|- bgcolor=#bfb
| 69 || June 17 || Tigers || 8–3 || Schilling (11–2) || Mlicki (4–8) || — || Bank One Ballpark || 39,760 || 42–27 || W2
|- bgcolor=#bfb
| 70 || June 19 || @ Dodgers || 9–2 || Johnson (9–4) || Dreifort (4–6) || — || Dodger Stadium || 31,160 || 43–27 || W3
|- bgcolor=#fbb
| 71 || June 20 || @ Dodgers || 3–4 || Shaw (3–2) || Sabel (3–1) || — || Dodger Stadium || 35,561 || 43–28 || L1
|- bgcolor=#bfb
| 72 || June 21 || @ Rockies || 14–5 || Bierbrodt (2–0) || Hampton (9–3) || — || Coors Field || 40,036 || 44–28 || W1
|- bgcolor=#bfb
| 73 || June 22 || @ Rockies || 5–4  || Swindell (2–1) || Jimenez (3–1) || Prinz (7) || Coors Field || 44,655 || 45–28 || W2
|- bgcolor=#bfb
| 74 || June 23 || @ Rockies || 9–5 || Kim (3–2) || White (1–4) || — || Coors Field || 41,612 || 46–28 || W3
|- bgcolor=#fbb
| 75 || June 24 || @ Rockies || 6–7 || Neagle (6–2) || Johnson (9–5) || Jimenez (12) || Coors Field || 41,682 || 46–29 || L1
|- bgcolor=#fbb
| 76 || June 25 || Astros || 0–6 || Miller (9–3) || Batista (4–4) || — || Bank One Ballpark || 27,230 || 46–30 || L2
|- bgcolor=#fbb
| 77 || June 26 || Astros || 7–10 || Dotel (5–4) || Bierbrodt (2–1) || Wagner (16) || Bank One Ballpark || 30,566 || 46–31 || L3
|- bgcolor=#bfb
| 78 || June 27 || Astros || 7–5 || Schilling (12–2) || Elarton (4–8) || — || Bank One Ballpark || 28,802 || 47–31 || W1
|- bgcolor=#bfb
| 79 || June 29 || Rockies || 5–3 || Johnson (10–5) || Astacio (5–9) || Kim (4) || Bank One Ballpark || 34,291 || 48–31 || W2
|- bgcolor=#bfb
| 80 || June 30 || Rockies || 6–5 || Brohawn (2–3) || Davis (0–2) || Prinz (8) || Bank One Ballpark || 36,165 || 49–31 || W3
|-

|- bgcolor=#bfb
| 81 || July 1 || Rockies || 5–4  || Prinz (3–0) || White (1–6) || — || Bank One Ballpark || 31,999 || 50–31 || W4
|- bgcolor=#fbb
| 82 || July 3 || @ Astros || 5–6 || Mlicki (5–8) || Schilling (12–3) || Wagner (18) || Enron Field || 40,982 || 50–32 || L1
|- bgcolor=#bfb
| 83 || July 4 || @ Astros || 3–2 || Johnson (10–5) || Reynolds (8–7) || Kim (5) || Enron Field || 41,216 || 51–32 || W1
|- bgcolor=#fbb
| 84 || July 5 || @ Astros || 1–5 || Oswalt (7–1) || Ellis (6–3) || — || Enron Field || 35,112 || 51–33 || L1
|- bgcolor=#fbb
| 85 || July 6 || Athletics || 0–3 || Mulder (9–6) || Anderson (2–4) || — || Bank One Ballpark || 34,008 || 51–34 || L2
|- bgcolor=#fbb
| 86 || July 7 || Athletics || 1–5 || Hudson (9–5) || Batista (4–5) || — || Bank One Ballpark || 36,978 || 51–35 || L3
|- bgcolor=#fbb
| 87 || July 8 || Athletics || 1–2 || Zito (6–6) || Schilling (12–4) || Isringhausen (17) || Bank One Ballpark || 31,927 || 51–36 || L4
|- bgcolor="bbcaff"
| – || July 10 || 72nd All-Star Game || colspan=8 | AL defeats NL 4–1 at Safeco Field
|- bgcolor=#fbb
| 88 || July 12 || @ Angels || 1–4 || Schoeneweis (7–8) || Anderson (2–5) || Percival (22) || Edison International Field of Anaheim || 18,724 || 51–37 || L5
|- bgcolor=#bfb
| 89 || July 13 || @ Angels || 6–2 || Schilling (13–4) || Valdez (5–5) || — || Edison International Field of Anaheim || 32,777 || 52–37 || W1
|- bgcolor=#bfb
| 90 || July 14 || @ Angels || 7–5 || Prinz (4–0) || Percival (3–2) || Kim (6) || Edison International Field of Anaheim || 30,044 || 53–37 || W2
|- bgcolor=#fbb
| 91 || July 15 || @ Mariners || 0–8 || Sele (11–1) || Ellis (6–4) || — || Safeco Field || 45,855 || 53–38 || L1
|- bgcolor=#bfb
| 92 || July 16 || @ Mariners || 5–3 || Batista (5–5) || Halama (6–6) || Kim (7) || Safeco Field || 45,770 || 54–38 || W1
|- bgcolor=#fbb
| 93 || July 17 || @ Mariners || 1–6 || Abbott (8–2) || Anderson (2–6) || — || Safeco Field || 45,894 || 54–39 || L1
|- bgcolor=#bbb
| – || July 18 || @ Padres || colspan=8 | Suspended (power failure, continuation July 19)
|- bgcolor=#bfb
| 94 || July 19 || @ Padres || 3–0 || Johnson (12–5) || Williams (6–8) || — || Qualcomm Stadium || 22,184 || 55–39 || W1
|- bgcolor=#fbb
| 95 || July 19 || @ Padres || 4–8 || Jarvis (7–7) || Ellis (6–5) || Hoffman (21) || Qualcomm Stadium || 22,583 || 55–40 || L1
|- bgcolor=#fbb
| 96 || July 20 || @ Giants || 0–1 || Hernandez (8–11) || Batista (5–6) || Nen (29) || Pacific Bell Park || 41,287 || 55–41 || L2
|- bgcolor=#bfb
| 97 || July 21 || @ Giants || 9–2 || Schilling (14–4) || Jensen (0–2) || — || Pacific Bell Park || 41,669 || 56–41 || W1
|- bgcolor=#bfb
| 98 || July 22 || @ Giants || 12–4 || Anderson (3–6) || Rueter (9–7) || — || Pacific Bell Park || 41,901 || 57–41 || W2
|- bgcolor=#fbb
| 99 || July 23 || Padres || 2–4 || Williams (7–8) || Bierbrodt (2–2) || Hoffman (23) || Bank One Ballpark || 28,687 || 57–42 || L1
|- bgcolor=#bfb
| 100 || July 24 || Padres || 11–0 || Johnson (13–5) || Jarvis (7–8) || — || Bank One Ballpark || 36,940 || 58–42 || W1
|- bgcolor=#bfb
| 101 || July 25 || Padres || 9–6 || Batista (6–6) || Hitchcock (2–1) || Kim (8) || Bank One Ballpark || 28,376 || 59–42 || W2
|- bgcolor=#fbb
| 102 || July 26 || Giants || 3–11 || Hernandez (9–11) || Schilling (14–5) || — || Bank One Ballpark || 33,666 || 59–43 || L1
|- bgcolor=#fbb
| 103 || July 27 || Giants || 5–9 || Rueter (10–7) || Anderson (3–7) || — || Bank One Ballpark || 35,853 || 59–44 || L2
|- bgcolor=#fbb
| 104 || July 28 || Giants || 4–11 || Ortiz (12–3) || Lopez (5–13) || — || Bank One Ballpark || 47,570 || 59–45 || L3
|- bgcolor=#fbb
| 105 || July 29 || Giants || 3–4 || Estes (8–5) || Kim (3–3) || Nen (30) || Bank One Ballpark || 38,093 || 59–46 || L4
|- bgcolor=#bfb
| 106 || July 31 || Expos || 3–1 || Schilling (15–5) || Munoz (0–1) || — || Bank One Ballpark || 27,726 || 60–46 || W1
|-

|- bgcolor=#fbb
| 107 || August 1 || Expos || 5–8 || Thurman (6–7) || Anderson (3–8) || Stewart (1) || Bank One Ballpark || 25,668 || 60–47 || L1
|- bgcolor=#fbb
| 108 || August 2 || Expos || 0–1 || Vazquez (10–10) || Lopez (5–14) || Stewart (2) || Bank One Ballpark || 28,688 || 60–48 || L2
|- bgcolor=#bfb
| 109 || August 3 || Mets || 7–0 || Johnson (14–5) || Leiter (6–9) || — || Bank One Ballpark || 43,806 || 61–48 || W1
|- bgcolor=#fbb
| 110 || August 4 || Mets || 2–4 || Appier (6–10) || Batista (6–7) || Benitez (25) || Bank One Ballpark || 36,750 || 61–49 || L1
|- bgcolor=#bfb
| 111 || August 5 || Mets || 2–1 || Schilling (16–5) || White (3–2) || Kim (9) || Bank One Ballpark || 36,870 || 62–49 || W1
|- bgcolor=#fbb
| 112 || August 7 || @ Marlins || 4–10 || Clement (7–7) || Lopez (5–15) || — || Pro Player Stadium || 13,050 || 62–50 || L1
|- bgcolor=#bfb
| 113 || August 8 || @ Marlins || 7–1 || Johnson (15–5) || Sanchez (2–1) || — || Pro Player Stadium || 17,261 || 63–50 || W1
|- bgcolor=#fbb
| 114 || August 9 || @ Marlins || 1–3 || Darensbourg (1–0) || Swindell (2–2) || Alfonseca (23) || Pro Player Stadium || 15,615 || 63–51 || L1
|- bgcolor=#bfb
| 115 || August 10 || @ Braves || 7–0 || Schilling (17–5) || Millwood (2–5) || — || Turner Field || 40,101 || 64–51 || W1
|- bgcolor=#bfb
| 116 || August 11 || @ Braves || 3–1 || Batista (7–7) || Marquis (2–4) || Kim (10) || Turner Field || 48,367 || 65–51 || W2
|- bgcolor=#bfb
| 117 || August 12 || @ Braves || 9–1 || Lopez (6–15) || Maddux (15–7) || — || Turner Field || 34,702 || 66–51 || W3
|- bgcolor=#bfb
| 118 || August 13 || Pirates || 3–0 || Johnson (16–5) || Anderson (6–13) || — || Bank One Ballpark || 32,386 || 67–51 || W4
|- bgcolor=#bfb
| 119 || August 14 || Pirates || 4–3  || Batista (8–7) || Marte (0–1) || — || Bank One Ballpark || 31,006 || 68–51 || W5
|- bgcolor=#bfb
| 120 || August 15 || Pirates || 5–2 || Schilling (18–5) || Williams (1–5) || — || Bank One Ballpark || 28,703 || 69–51 || W6
|- bgcolor=#bfb
| 121 || August 17 || Cubs || 7–2 || Lopez (7–15) || Tapani (8–10) || Kim (11) || Bank One Ballpark || 42,667 || 70–51 || W7
|- bgcolor=#bfb
| 122 || August 18 || Cubs || 5–3 || Johnson (17–5) || Bere (8–7) || Kim (12) || Bank One Ballpark || 47,489 || 71–51 || W8
|- bgcolor=#bfb
| 123 || August 19 || Cubs || 13–6 || Witt (1–1) || Ohman (0–1) || — || Bank One Ballpark || 44,449 || 72–51 || W9
|- bgcolor=#fbb
| 124 || August 21 || @ Pirates || 2–4 || Olivares (6–7) || Schilling (18–6) || Fetters (4) || PNC Park || 35,131 || 72–52 || L1
|- bgcolor=#bfb
| 125 || August 22 || @ Pirates || 6–0 || Lopez (8–15) || Beimel (5–10) || — || PNC Park || 26,531 || 73–52 || W1
|- bgcolor=#fbb
| 126 || August 23 || @ Pirates || 1–5 || McKnight (2–3) || Johnson (17–6) || Fetters (5) || PNC Park || 30,794 || 73–53 || L1
|- bgcolor=#fbb
| 127 || August 24 || @ Phillies || 5–6 || Daal (12–4) || Anderson (3–9) || Mesa (33) || Veterans Stadium || 35,173 || 73–54 || L2
|- bgcolor=#bfb
| 128 || August 25 || @ Phillies || 4–3 || Batista (9–7) || Coggin (4–3) || Kim (13) || Veterans Stadium || 23,953 || 74–54 || W1
|- bgcolor=#bfb
| 129 || August 26 || @ Phillies || 4–3  || Kim (4–3) || Politte (0–2) || — || Veterans Stadium || 35,093 || 75–54 || W2
|- bgcolor=#fbb
| 130 || August 27 || @ Phillies || 1–2 || Person (12–6) || Lopez (8–16) || Mesa (34) || Veterans Stadium || 18,303 || 75–55 || L1
|- bgcolor=#bfb
| 131 || August 28 || Giants || 4–1 || Johnson (18–6) || Hernandez (11–13) || Kim' (14) || Bank One Ballpark || 41,502 || 76–55 || W1
|- bgcolor=#bfb
| 132 || August 29 || Giants || 2–0 || Witt (2–1) || Rueter (12–10) || Kim (15) || Bank One Ballpark || 31,990 || 77–55 || W2
|- bgcolor=#fbb
| 133 || August 30 || Giants || 5–13 || Schmidt (10–7) || Batista (9–8) || — || Bank One Ballpark || 34,269 || 77–56 || L1
|- bgcolor=#bfb
| 134 || August 31  || @ Padres || 4–1 || Schilling (19–6) || Jodie (0–2) || Prinz (9) || Qualcomm Stadium || N/A || 78–56 || W1
|- bgcolor=#fbb
| 135 || August 31  || @ Padres || 5–6 || Nunez (3–2) || Prinz (4–1) || Hoffman (34) || Qualcomm Stadium || 24,372 || 78–57 || L1
|-

|- bgcolor=#fbb
| 136 || September 1 || @ Padres || 5–7 || Lee (1–0) || Kim (4–4) || Hoffman (35) || Qualcomm Stadium || 34,252 || 78–58 || L2
|- bgcolor=#fbb
| 137 || September 2 || @ Padres || 0–1  || Serrano (3–2) || Kim (4–5) || — || Qualcomm Stadium || 23,475 || 78–59 || L3
|- bgcolor=#fbb
| 138 || September 4 || @ Giants || 2–5 || Schmidt (11–7) || Swindell (2–3) || Nen (39) || Pacific Bell Park || 40,869 || 78–60 || L4
|- bgcolor=#bfb
| 139 || September 5 || @ Giants || 7–2 || Schilling (20–6) || Ortiz (14–9) || — || Pacific Bell Park || 40,972 || 79–60 || W1
|- bgcolor=#fbb
| 140 || September 6 || @ Giants || 5–9 || Fultz (3–1) || Lopez (8–17) || — || Pacific Bell Park || 41,155 || 79–61 || L1
|- bgcolor=#fbb
| 141 || September 7 || Padres || 3–4 || Fikac (2–0) || Swindell (2–4) || Hoffman (36) || Bank One Ballpark || 32,184 || 79–62 || L2
|- bgcolor=#bfb
| 142 || September 8 || Padres || 8–6  || Kim (5–5) || Serrano (3–3) || — || Bank One Ballpark || 39,929 || 80–62 || W1
|- bgcolor=#bfb
| 143 || September 9 || Padres || 8–2 || Witt (3–1) || Jones (8–18) || Kim (16) || Bank One Ballpark || 33,741 || 81–62 || W2
|- bgcolor=#bbb
| – || September 11 || Rockies || colspan=8 | Postponed (9/11 attacks, makeup October 2)
|- bgcolor=#bbb
| – || September 12 || Rockies || colspan=8 | Postponed (9/11 attacks, makeup October 3)
|- bgcolor=#bbb
| – || September 13 || Rockies || colspan=8 | Postponed (9/11 attacks, makeup October 4)
|- bgcolor=#bbb
| – || September 14 || @ Brewers || colspan=8 | Postponed (9/11 attacks, makeup October 5)
|- bgcolor=#bbb
| – || September 15 || @ Brewers || colspan=8 | Postponed (9/11 attacks, makeup October 6)
|- bgcolor=#bbb
| – || September 16 || @ Brewers || colspan=8 | Postponed (9/11 attacks, makeup October 7)
|- bgcolor=#bfb
| 144 || September 17 || @ Rockies || 7–3 || Johnson (19–6) || Davis (1–4) || — || Coors Field || 31,111 || 82–62 || W3
|- bgcolor=#fbb
| 145 || September 18 || @ Rockies || 9–10 || Myers (2–3) || Kim (5–6) || — || Coors Field || 30,552 || 82–63 || L1
|- bgcolor=#fbb
| 146 || September 19 || @ Rockies || 2–8 || Hampton (14–11) || Lopez (8–18) || — || Coors Field || 30,301 || 82–64 || L2
|- bgcolor=#fbb
| 147 || September 20 || @ Dodgers || 2–3  || Prokopec (8–6) || Swindell (2–5) || — || Dodger Stadium || 31,776 || 82–65 || L3
|- bgcolor=#bfb
| 148 || September 21 || @ Dodgers || 10–0 || Batista (10–8) || Mulholland (1–1) || — || Dodger Stadium || 44,321 || 83–65 || W1
|- bgcolor=#fbb
| 149 || September 22 || @ Dodgers || 5–6  || Gagne (5–7) || Koplove (0–1) || — || Dodger Stadium || 40,215 || 83–66 || L1
|- bgcolor=#bfb
| 150 || September 23 || @ Dodgers || 6–1 || Schilling (21–6) || Adams (12–8) || — || Dodger Stadium || 48,410 || 84–66 || W1
|- bgcolor=#fbb
| 151 || September 25 || Brewers || 4–9 || D'Amico (2–3) || Lopez (8–19) || — || Bank One Ballpark || 35,032 || 84–67 || L1
|- bgcolor=#bfb
| 152 || September 26 || Brewers || 15–9 || Witt (4–1) || Buddie (0–1) || — || Bank One Ballpark || 30,658 || 85–67 || W1
|- bgcolor=#bfb
| 153 || September 27 || Brewers || 13–11 || Johnson (20–6) || Quevedo (4–5) || Kim (17) || Bank One Ballpark || 28,359 || 86–67 || W2
|- bgcolor=#bfb
| 154 || September 28 || Dodgers || 4–3  || Morgan (1–0) || Trombley (3–8) || — || Bank One Ballpark || 46,838 || 87–67 || W3
|- bgcolor=#bfb
| 155 || September 29 || Dodgers || 8–1 || Batista (11–8) || Baldwin (9–11) || — || Bank One Ballpark || 43,936 || 88–67 || W4
|- bgcolor=#fbb
| 156 || September 30 || Dodgers || 1–2 || Park (15–11) || Swindell (2–6) || Shaw (40) || Bank One Ballpark || 43,138 || 88–68 || L1
|-

|- bgcolor=#bfb
| 158 || October 2 || Rockies || 10–1 || Johnson (21–6) || Hampton (14–13) || — || Bank One Ballpark || 36,263 || 89–68 || W1
|- bgcolor=#bfb
| 159 || October 3 || Rockies || 4–3 || Schilling (22–6) || Chacón (6–10) || Kim (18) || Bank One Ballpark || 32,521 || 90–68 || W2
|- bgcolor=#bfb
| 160 || October 4 || Rockies || 5–4 || Anderson (4–9) || Neagle (9–8) || Kim (19) || Bank One Ballpark || 29,382 || 91–68 || W3
|- bgcolor=#bfb
| 161 || October 5 || @ Brewers || 5–0 || Lopez (9–19) || Levrault (6–10) || — || Miller Park || 24,700 || 92–68 || W4
|- bgcolor=#fbb
| 161 || October 6 || @ Brewers || 4–5 || Fox (5–2) || Sabel (3–2) || — || Miller Park || 40,038 || 92–69 || L1
|- bgcolor=#fbb
| 162 || October 7 || @ Brewers || 5–15 || Sheets (11–10) || Knott (0–1) || — || Miller Park || 31,761 || 92–70 || L2
|-

Player stats

Batting
Note: Pos = Position; G = Games played; AB = At bats; H = Hits; HR = Home runs; RBI = Runs batted in; Avg. = Batting average

Other batters
Note: G = Games played; AB = At bats; H = Hits; HR = Home runs; RBI = Runs batted in; Avg. = Batting average

Starting pitchers
Note: G = Games pitched; IP = Innings pitched; W = Wins; L = Losses; ERA = Earned run average; SO = Strikeouts

Other pitchers
Note: G = Games pitched; IP = Innings pitched; W = Wins; L = Losses; ERA = Earned run average; SO = Strikeouts

Relief pitchers
Note: G = Games pitched; IP = Innings pitched; W = Wins; L = Losses; SV = Saves; ERA = Earned run average; SO = Strikeouts

Post season

NLDS

Arizona wins the series, 3-2

NLCS

World series

Game 1
October 27, 2001 at Bank One Ballpark in Phoenix, Arizona

Game 2
October 28, 2001 at Bank One Ballpark in Phoenix, Arizona

Game 3
October 30, 2001 at Yankee Stadium in New York

Game 4
October 31, 2001 at Yankee Stadium in New York City

Game 5
November 1, 2001 at Yankee Stadium in New York

Game 6
November 3, 2001 at Bank One Ballpark in Phoenix, Arizona

Game 7
November 4, 2001 at Bank One Ballpark in Phoenix, Arizona

Game log

|-  style="text-align:center; background:#bfb;"
| 1 || October 9 || Cardinals || 1–0 || Schilling (1–0) || Morris (0–1) || || Bank One Ballpark || 42,251 || 1–0 || NLDS 1
|-  style="text-align:center; background:#fbb;"
| 2 || October 10 || Cardinals || 1–4 || Williams (1–0) || Johnson (0–1) || Kline (1) || Bank One Ballpark || 41,793 || 1–1 || NLDS 2
|-  style="text-align:center; background:#bfb;"
| 3 || October 12 || @ Cardinals || 5–3 || Batista (1–0) || Matthews (0–1) || Kim (1) || Busch Memorial Stadium || 52,273 || 2–1 || NLDS 3
|-  style="text-align:center; background:#fbb;"
| 4 || October 13 || @ Cardinals || 1–4 || Smith (1–0) || Lopez (0–1)  || Kline (2) || Busch Memorial Stadium || 52,194 || 2–2 || NLDS 4
|-  style="text-align:center; background:#bfb;"
| 5 || October 14 || Cardinals || 2–1 || Schilling (2–0) || Kline (0–1) || || Bank One Ballpark || 42,810 || 3–2 || NLDS 5
|-

|-  style="text-align:center; background:#bfb;"
| 1 || October 16 || Braves || 2–0 || Johnson (1–0) || || || Bank One Ballpark || 37,729 || 1–0 || NLCS 1
|-  style="text-align:center; background:#fbb;"
| 2 || October 17 || Braves || 1–8 || || Batista (0–1) || || Bank One Ballpark || 49,334 || 1–1 || NLCS 2
|-  style="text-align:center; background:#bfb;"
| 3 || October 19 || @ Braves || 5–1 || Schilling (1–0) || || || Turner Field || 41,624 || 2–1 || NLCS 3
|-  style="text-align:center; background:#bfb;"
| 4 || October 20 || @ Braves || 11–4 || Anderson (1–0) || || Kim (1) || Turner Field || 42,291 || 3–1 || NLCS 4
|-  style="text-align:center; background:#bfb;"
| 5 || October 21 || @ Braves || 3–2 || Johnson (2–0) || || Kim (2) || Turner Field || 35,652 || 4–1 || NLCS 5
|-

|-  style="text-align:center; background:#bfb;"
| 1 || October 27 || Yankees || 9–1 || Schilling (1–0) || Mussina (0–1) || || Bank One Ballpark || 49,646 || 1–0 || WS 1
|-  style="text-align:center; background:#bfb;"
| 2 || October 28 || Yankees || 4–0 || Johnson (1–0) || Pettitte (0–1) || || Bank One Ballpark || 49,646 || 2–0 || WS 2
|-  style="text-align:center; background:#fbb;"
| 3 || October 30 || @ Yankees || 1–2 || Clemens (1–0) || Anderson (0–1) || Rivera (1) || Yankee Stadium || 55,820 || 2–1 || WS 3
|-  style="text-align:center; background:#fbb;"
| 4 || October 31 || @ Yankees || 3–4 (10 inn.) || Rivera (1–0) || Kim (0–1) || || Yankee Stadium || 55,863 || 2–2 || WS 4
|-  style="text-align:center; background:#fbb;"
| 5 || November 1 || @ Yankees || 2–3 (12 inn.) || Hitchcock (1–0) || Lopez (0–1) || || Yankee Stadium || 56,018 || 2–3 || WS 5
|-  style="text-align:center; background:#bfb;"
| 6 || November 3 || Yankees || 15–2 || Johnson (2–0) || Pettitte (0–2) || || Bank One Ballpark || 49,707 || 3–3 || WS 6
|-  style="text-align:center; background:#bfb;"
| 7 || November 4 || Yankees || 3–2 || Johnson (3–0) || Rivera (1–1) || || Bank One Ballpark || 49,589 || 4–3 || WS 7
|-

Notes:

 All times in Mountain Standard Time.

Game times

Umpires

Awards and honors
 Curt Schilling and Randy Johnson, Pitchers, Sports Illustrated Sportsman of the Year
 Curt Schilling and Randy Johnson, Pitchers, World Series Most Valuable Player
 Craig Counsell, National League Championship Series Most Valuable Player
 Luis Gonzalez, National League Silver Slugger Award
 Randy Johnson, National League Cy Young Award
 Curt Schilling, Hutch Award
 Curt Schilling, Pitcher, Roberto Clemente Award
2001 Major League Baseball All-Star Game

League leaders
Luis Gonzalez
 #3 in NL in home runs (57)
 #3 in NL in RBI (142)
 #3 in NL in slugging percentage (.688)
 #4 in NL in runs scored (128)

Randy Johnson
 Led MLB in ERA (2.49)
 Led MLB in strikeouts (372)
 #3 in NL in wins (21)

Curt Schilling
 Led MLB in wins (22)
 Led NL in complete games (6)
 #2 in NL in ERA (2.98)
 #2 in NL in strikeouts (293)

Media

Local TV

Local Cable TV

Local Radio

-Some 2001 Arizona Diamondbacks radio network games broadcast on alternate flagship station KKLT-FM because of broadcast conflict with the (Phoenix Suns) of the (NBA) and the (Arizona Cardinals) of the (NFL).

Farm system

References

External links
Arizona Diamondbacks official web site 
2001 Arizona Diamondbacks team at Baseball Reference
2001 Arizona Diamondbacks team page at www.baseball-almanac.com

Arizona Diamondbacks Season, 2001
Arizona Diamondbacks seasons
National League West champion seasons
National League champion seasons
World Series champion seasons
Arizonia